For the 1927–28 season, Nelson Football Club played as a professional outfit in the Football League for the seventh consecutive campaign. Nelson finished last out of 22 teams in the Third Division North, with a record of 10 wins, 6 draws and 26 defeats, corresponding to a tally of 26 points. As a result, the club was forced to apply for re-election to the League at the end of the season. The application was successful, with Nelson retaining their berth in place of Durham City. Due to the departure of Percy Smith to Bury, Nelson did not have a manager installed during the entire season. The team played inconsistently throughout the campaign from the outset, losing the opening two matches before winning four consecutive games during September 1927. Nelson suffered several comprehensive defeats during the 1927–28 season, including a 1–9 defeat to Bradford City, a 0–8 loss away at Stockport County and a 1–7 reverse against Accrington Stanley. In total, the team conceded 136 goals in 42 league matches, one of the highest totals in Football League history.

Outside of league competition, Nelson entered the FA Cup but were knocked out in the First Round following a 0–3 defeat to Bradford Park Avenue at Seedhill. They also competed in the Lancashire Senior Cup, but suffered a 2–10 loss to Second Division side Manchester City. Nelson used 33 different players during the season. Many of these were new arrivals at the club; a number of the professional staff from the previous campaign had been released due to the club's increasing debts. Forward Jimmy Hampson, the top goalscorer in 1926–27, was sold to Blackpool in October 1927 for a transfer fee of £1,250 and went on to become an England international. His replacement, Bernard Radford, was Nelson's highest scorer in the 1927–28 campaign with 17 league goals. Scottish striker Buchanan Sharp was the only other player to reach double figures with his tally of 11. Only one player, Joe Halliwell appeared in all 43 competitive matches; former England international George Wilson appeared in 40 of the games. Many squad members were bit-part players, with more than half of the team making fewer than 10 competitive appearances.

The highest attendance of the season at Nelson's Seedhill stadium was around 9,000 for the FA Cup tie against Bradford Park Avenue, while the lowest gate was 1,126 (the club's lowest ever Football League attendance) for the 3–5 home defeat to Tranmere Rovers on 24 April 1928.

Football League Third Division North

Key

H = Home match
A = Away match

In Result column, Nelson's score shown first
Goalscorers shown in order of first goal scored

Match results

Final league position

FA Cup

Match results

Player statistics
Key to positions

CF = Centre forward
FB = Fullback
GK = Goalkeeper

HB = Half-back
IF = Inside forward
OF = Outside forward

Statistics

See also
List of Nelson F.C. seasons

References

Nelson F.C. seasons
Nelson